Oreolalax rugosus (Chaochiao lazy toad or warty toothed toad) is a species of amphibian in the family Megophryidae.
It is endemic to China where it can be found in the Hengduan Mountains in southern Sichuan and northern Yunnan provinces. Its natural habitats are subtropical moist montane forests and rivers. It is threatened by habitat loss.

References

Oreolalax
Amphibians of China
Endemic fauna of China
Taxonomy articles created by Polbot
Amphibians described in 1943